Jessel is a surname. Notable people with the surname include:

 Sir Charles Jessel, (1860–1928),  baronet, British barrister, magistrate and businessman
 David Jessel, British journalist
 George Jessel:
 George Jessel (actor) (1898–1981), American vaudevillian
 George Jessel (jurist) (1824–1883), British jurist
 Herbert Jessel, 1st Baron Jessel (1866–1950), British soldier and politician
 Leon Jessel, German composer
 Patricia Jessel, actress
 Stephen Jessel, British correspondent
 Ray Jessel (1929—2015), American-Welsh composer
 Thomas Jessell, scientist
 Toby Jessel, British politician
 Morten Jessel, Danish attorney-at-law

Fictional people
 Miss Jessel, a character in Henry James's The Turn of the Screw and its adaptations